Antepione is a genus of moths in the family Geometridae, the geometer moths. The genus was described by Packard in 1876. They occur in North and Central America.

There are three species:
 Antepione imitata H. Edwards, 1884
 Antepione thisoaria (Guenée, 1857) - variable antepione
 Antepione tiselaaria (Dyar, 1912)

References

External links

Ourapterygini
Geometridae genera